Admiral Sir Herbert Goodenough King-Hall,  (15 March 1862 – 20 October 1936) was a Royal Navy officer who went on to be Commander-in-Chief, Cape of Good Hope Station.

Naval career
Born the son of Admiral Sir William King-Hall, Herbert King-Hall joined the Royal Navy in 1875. He fought in the Anglo-Egyptian War in 1882, and later commanded the special service vessel HMS Hearty. Promoted to Captain in 1900, he took part in the Second Boer War and was mentioned in despatches. After the war ended in June 1902, King-Hall stayed in South Africa as Principal Transport Officer at Cape Town. He was appointed in command of HMS Endymion in 1903. King-Hall was appointed assistant director of Naval Intelligence in 1905 and was given command of HMS Indomitable in 1908. Promoted to Rear-Admiral in 1909, he became Second-in-Command of the 2nd Battle Squadron before being appointed Commander-in-Chief, Cape of Good Hope Station in 1913 and serving in that role during World War I. He led the operation to successfully destroy and then sink SMS Königsberg on the Rufiji River in Tanzania in July 1915. He was appointed a Knight Commander of the Order of the Bath in the 1916 New Year Honours. His last appointment was as Admiral Commanding, Orkneys and Shetlands in 1918.

Family
In 1905 he married Lady Mabel Emily Murray, daughter of Viscount Stormont (son of William Murray, 4th Earl of Mansfield). His older brother was Admiral Sir George King-Hall, his nephew the naval officer, writer, politician and playwright Stephen King-Hall, his niece the novelist, journalist and children's fiction writer Magdalen King-Hall.

References

|-

1862 births
1936 deaths
Royal Navy admirals of World War I
Knights Commander of the Order of the Bath
Commanders of the Royal Victorian Order
Companions of the Distinguished Service Order
People educated at Stubbington House School